Nuritamburia metallurgica is a moth of the family Tortricidae. It was first described by Lord Walsingham in 1907. It is endemic to the Hawaiian islands of Oahu, Molokai, Lanai and Hawaii.

The larvae possibly feed on Phyllanthus and Xylosma species.

External links

Archipini
Endemic moths of Hawaii